Vada or  Wada is one of the eight talukas of the Palghar district in the Konkan division of Maharashtra state in India. Centuries ago wada taluka known as kamalpur It is one of the most industrialised talukas in Palghar district.

Geography
It has an average elevation of 38 metres (124 feet). It was formerly in Thane district.

Rivers, fort and lakes
The main rivers flowing through Wada are the Vaitarna and Pinjal. There are three main lakes in Wada town.
Kohoj Killa is a fort near Kanchad Village at Vaghote.

Temples:-
Lord Shiva temple which is at Tilase village in Wada tehsil is very famous,people comes from different areas during Mahashivaratri.

Castes
There are many castes living in Wada taluka, mainly Maratha, Adivasi, Kunbi, Nhavi, Agri, Koli, Bhanushali, Vaishya Vani, Chambhar, Muslims, Buddhist and Sonar.

Education
This city has schools and colleges:
 Sarswati Vidya Mandir Kanchad
 True Light English Medium School
 Little Angel's English medium school 
 Pandurang Javji high school
 Swami Vivekanand Vidyamandir & Jr College
 Sharda Vidyalaya
 Wada College of Management & science
 Anand Laxman College of Science, Art & Commerce
 Ideal CBSE School
 Ideal Group of Colleges, Posheri

Demographics
 India census, Wada had a population of 75,291. Males constituted 52% of the population and females 48%. Wada has an average literacy rate of 92%, higher than the national average of 72.5%. In Wada, 12% of the population is under six years of age.

 India census, Wada taluka has a population of 142,753, with 52.33% males and 47.66% females. Of the total population, 128,467 persons live in rural areas and 14,286 in urban areas; at the 2011 Census the population had risen to 178,370. Wada is emerging as a new industrial hub with several industrial undertakings and foundries being established recently.

References

Cities and towns in Palghar district
Talukas in Maharashtra
Palghar district

4. Wada taluka marathi information.       आम्ही पालघरकर Marathi blog